The Summerland Australian Football League or SAFL was an Australian rules football competition in the Northern Rivers and New England region of New South Wales, Australia, in existence from 1984 to 2011. It now is reformed under the AFL Queensland banner under various QFA divisions, currently QFA Division 2 South/Northern Rivers.

History
The Northern Rivers region is a competitive area for sports including football, rugby league and rugby union. This has caused a continual struggle for strong numbers at all the clubs and therefore has caused several teams to fold over its history.

The Summerland AFL was formed in 1984, with Ballina, Byron, the Goonellabah Swans and Lismore Kangaroos as foundation clubs.  Ballina and Byron are the only clubs to have continued in the same form for the entire history of the league, and the two clubs have dominated the competition for most of its history, being premiers 17 out of 27 seasons and winning every flag between 1999 and 2009.

The Murwillumbah Hawks joined in 1985, and the league continued in this form until 1994.

In 1995 the Grafton Tigers joined from the North Coast AFL, temporarily bringing the number of clubs to six, until Murwillumbah folded after the 1999 season.  
 
The Nimbin Demons first joined in 1988 making it to the preliminary final the first two years but after disbanding in the mid 90's re-joined in 2001, bringing the number of clubs back up to six.  However at the end of this season, Grafton returned to the North Coast AFL, and the Lismore Kangaroos went bankrupt and merged with Goonellabah to form the Lismore Swans.

The Casino Lions formed in 2003 and competed for the next five seasons.  Murwillumbah also rejoined for the seasons 2004-06.

In 2009, the Tweed Coast Tigers joined the league.  Byron won the premiership for the third year running, but not until after Lismore lodged an appeal against the umpires' decision that disallowed a goal after the game concluded. The appeal was dismissed.

In 2010, the league featured six senior clubs, after the admission of Coolangatta-Tweed Heads.  Coolangatta field two senior teams in the AFL Queensland, and their third senior side, based around under 23 and developing players, in the Summerland AFL.  The Tweed Coast Tigers won the premiership in that season, the first team to break the Byron-Ballina stranglehold on the cup since 1998.

In 2011, the league started with six teams again but mid way through the season Coolangatta and Nimbin withdrew from the competition. This forced a re draw for the rest of the season. After the Home and Away season Tweed Coast finished first, followed by Ballina, Lismore and Byron Bay. The grand final was played between Tweed Coast and Lismore and Lismore won their first premiership as a merged club.

In 2012, all four clubs joined AFL South East Queensland and commenced the season in Division 4 South.

Clubs

Grand Finals

See also
AFL NSW/ACT
Australian rules football in New South Wales

References

External links
Official Summerland AFL website

Sport on the Gold Coast, Queensland
Northern Rivers
Australian rules football in Australia
Defunct Australian rules football competitions in New South Wales
Sports leagues established in 1984
1984 establishments in Australia
2011 disestablishments in Australia